Willem Krul (28 March 1722 – 4 February 1781), (also spelled as Krull or Crul) was a vice-admiral in the Dutch Navy in the latter 18th century, and then commander of the Dutch frigate Mars, during the American Revolutionary War. He was also known as Adrianus Hendrik Willem Krul. After serving in various assignments about the European Atlantic coast Krul served in his final naval assignment at Saint Eustatius, a Dutch possession in the West Indies, during which time he lost his life while engaged in a naval battle with the British, making him a national hero in the Netherlands.

Early life 
Krul was born and raised at The Hague, South Holland in the Netherlands, the son of Arie Krul and Elizabeth Maaskant. Krul's father died shortly after his birth. At the age of 24 he was married to Catrina de Hoogh on 8 February, at Den Haag, and they had a son, Arie Hendrik Willem Krul.

Early naval service 
In the years 1742–1744 Krul made a voyage to Batavia as a lieutenant in the service of the Dutch East India Company on the ship Anna. He was appointed naval captain on the Maze in 1752.  After moving to Den Bosch in 1753, he bought a house in Vught for his mother and two of his then unmarried sisters, Alexandrina and Elizabeth. In 1759 he bought the manor Landgoed Burgst.

Final assignment 

Krul was employed on 19 October 1778 by the Dutch East India Company and stationed on the small Dutch isle of Saint Eustatius in the West Indies which provided a neutral port and naval support for various cargo and other ships which arrived and departed on a daily basis during the American Revolutionary War. The Dutch, though their ports were protected by their neutral status, were at the center of the arms trade with the former British colonies and were supplying them via this isle with nearly half of their military supplies. This sort of trading with Britain's enemies is what instigated the Fourth Anglo-Dutch War where Admiral Rodney was subsequently sent to Saint Eustatius (and other Dutch possessions) in the West Indies in February 1781 to neutralize the operation. Shortly after he had captured Saint Eustatius, lying only 50 miles north of British Saint Kitts,  Rodney learned that a fleet of thirty cargo ships, richly laden with sugar and other commodities, had just sailed for Holland, under the escort of Admiral Krul and his flag-ship, Mars, a man-of-war. Rodney immediately dispatched three ships, HMS Monarch, Panther and Sybil, under the command of Admiral Francis Reynolds, to give chase and capture the enormous 30 vessel prize, with orders to pursue them no further than the latitude of Bermuda.

Krul's convoy was soon located and overtaken near the small island of Sombrero, approximately 90 miles north of Saint Eustatius. After surrounding Krul's ship Reynolds called for the immediate and unconditional surrender of the convoy, which was pointedly declined by Krul who didn't know war on the Netherlands had been declared by Britain. During the ensuing engagement on 4 February 1781 Krul, with a single warship, resolved to uphold the honor of the Dutch flag and confront his pursuers with the hopes of giving the cargo ships a chance to escape. In so doing, however, he had grossly underestimated his opponent's overwhelming firepower. During the fierce thirty minute engagement Krul was mortally wounded. During the battle eight of Krul's crewmen also died and seven were wounded. Just before dying Krul gave his second in command, Captain Count van Bijland, orders to strike colors and surrender Mars to Admiral Reynolds. The scattered and defenseless convoy were immediately rounded up by Reynolds' faster war ships and escorted back to Saint Eustatius and taken as prizes of war, while the Mars was converted into a British warship. The body of Krul was safely preserved during the return voyage back to Saint Eustatius where he was buried with full military honors. The advent made him a national hero in the Netherlands, which soon inspired many works of art. The Rijksmuseum's collection contains at least 21 works of art relating to the naval battle and the death of Willem Krul.

See also 

 Naval history of the Netherlands
 Johannes de Graaff,  Governor of Sint Eustatius, in the Netherlands Antilles during the American Revolutionary War.
 Fourth Anglo-Dutch War
 Royal Netherlands Navy
 Bibliography of early American naval history

Notes

Citations

Bibliography 
 
 
 
 

 
 
 
 OpenArchives

Further reading 
 
 
 
 
 
 
 

1721 births
1781 deaths
Vice admirals
Military personnel from The Hague
18th-century Dutch military personnel
Sailors on ships of the Dutch East India Company
Sint Eustatius people
Dutch naval personnel of the Anglo-Dutch Wars
Dutch military personnel killed in action
Military personnel killed in the American Revolutionary War